Wakeskating is a water sport and an adaptation of wakeboarding that employs a similar design of board manufactured from maple or fibreglass. Unlike wakeboarding, the rider is not bound to the board in any way, similar to the skateboard, from which the name derives.

Design 
Fins are constructed of plastic, fiberglass or aluminum. Shorter fins must be deeper to get the same amount of tracking. A shallower fin does not track as well as a deeper one. But a deeper fin has more drag in the water, and does not release from the water as fast.

Wakeskating shoes are designed with quick drying materials and drainage channels. The drainage channels are a system of holes in the sole and channels through the midsole.
Most of Wakeskate boards are made with a grip tape on the upside part just as a skateboard. That grip tape is like a sand paper, it helps the rider to stay on the board and provide a good traction. It is the major reason why rider wears shoes. Some boards are made with a  foam instead of the regular skateboard grip-tape. That surface is easier on the skin if you fall. Also that kind of surface can be ridden bare feet.

History 
Wakeskating was pioneered by Thomas Horrell in the United States. Wakeskating has become urbanized due to the advent of the "winch", a mechanical device with a small horizontal shaft engine that holds a spool of rope and pulls the rope in at riding speed.

A wakeskate is an integral part of Wakeskating. There are five factors that differentiate one wakeskate from another. They are size, material, deck shape, deck surface and rocker type of a wakeskate.

Size

The size of a wakeskate is determined by the weight of the rider. The smallest wakeskate is available in the size of 39 inches which are suitable for a rider with a weight of 180 pounds. The length of a wakeskate can be more than 41 inches which are best for riders with a weight of 250 pounds or more.  Shorter wakeskates are easy to maneuver and can be easily flicked because of their lighter weight and smaller size. However, they are comparatively unstable as the rider lands on the surface of the water. Larger wakeskates offer more surface area that offers higher stability to the rider.

Material

A wakeskate is available in two types of material: wood and composite. Wood wakeskate consists of a wooden skate that is covered by marine grade epoxy that gives it a finished look and long life. However, the life of wood wakeskates is always shorter as compared to composite wakestakes because of the degradation of wood as a result of constant exposure to water. Thus, they do not usually come with any sort of manufacturer's warranty.

Composite wakeskates are more popular especially among the professional riders because of its lighter weight and longer life. They are completely made of synthetic materials that do not degrade quickly due to exposure to water. They are more expensive as compared to wood wakeskates.

See also
 Reed Hansen
 Skateboarding

References

Boardsports
Sports originating in Australia
Towed water sports
Wakeboarding